Ash Ketchum, known as  in Japan, is a fictional character in the Pokémon franchise owned by Nintendo, Game Freak, and Creatures. He is the protagonist of the Pokémon anime and certain manga series as well as on various merchandise related to the franchise. In Japanese, the character is voiced by Rika Matsumoto. Hana Takeda voices six-year-old Ash in episode 1 of Pokémon Journeys: The Series. In the English dub, he was voiced by Veronica Taylor in the first eight seasons and has been voiced by Sarah Natochenny since season 9.

Ash is a young man who travels with various companions, aiming to fulfill his dream to become a Pokémon Master and the greatest Pokémon Trainer in the world; his Pokémon lineup greatly evolves over the course of the series, with its sole constant member being Pikachu (nicknamed "Ash's Pikachu" by fans), the only character besides Ash to remain part of the series for its entirety. Ash is loosely based on Red, the player character from the Generation I games Pokémon Red, Green, Blue and Yellow as well as their remakes Pokémon FireRed and LeafGreen.

Ash Ketchum was first mentioned in a video game at the dialogue of Pokémon Play It!, and his first appearance in a game was in Pokémon Puzzle League. Satoshi Tajiri, the creator of Pokémon, with whom Ash shares his Japanese name, has stated that Ash represents the 'human aspect' of the series, and that Ash reflects what he himself was like as a kid. As the protagonist of the Pokémon anime, Ash has appeared in almost all episodes of the anime and all the films.

Due to the huge popularity, success, and longevity of the Pokémon anime series around the world since its debut, Ash has gone on to become one of the most well-known and recognizable fictional characters of all-time due to his status as the protagonist of the Pokémon anime. However, he is often overshadowed in series representation by the franchise mascot, Pikachu. Despite this, Ash, along with others from the series, is considered a pop culture icon, and a figurehead character of the wave of anime in the late 1990s; which is credited by most anime fans as having popularized anime in the west, alongside others such as Goku of Dragon Ball Z, Yugi of Yu-Gi-Oh!, and Sailor Moon of the show of the same name. He is also considered a major icon for Japanese pop culture in the United States.

Ash has been criticized for being stuck in a 'floating timeline', as well as for his long-lasting inability to win any major Pokémon leagues; he would win his first major league, the Alola League, during the anime's 22nd season in 2019. However, his longevity and persistence have also been positively received by major news outlets such as CNN and the BBC, as they are seen to represent that it is never too late to achieve one's dreams. Ash's outfits through the anime, especially his various hats, are also considered to be just as iconic as him, and also have good reception, in particular, his first outfit from the original series.

In the 132nd episode of the Journeys series, Ash becomes World Champion, referred to as "Monarch".

Concept and creation
Named after creator Satoshi Tajiri, Satoshi, whose name can be taken to mean "wisdom" or "reason", was designed by Ken Sugimori and Atsuko Nishida, and intended to represent how Tajiri was as a child, obsessed with catching bugs. During localization of both for North American audiences, the character's name was changed in the anime to "Ash Ketchum", the first name taken from one of the possible default names players could select for the player character in Pokémon Red and Blue, and the surname tying into the former tagline (and as of Pokémon XY revived) for the series, "Gotta catch ém all!" ("ポケモンGETだぜ!", "Pokémon getto da ze!").

Tajiri noted in an interview that between Japanese and US reactions to the series, Japanese consumers focused on the character Pikachu, while the US purchased more items featuring Ash and Pikachu, his Pokémon, together. He stated that he felt the character represented the concept of the franchise, the human aspect, and was a necessity. The character was given a rival named Gary Oak (Shigeru Okido in the Japanese version, after Tajiri's idol/mentor, Nintendo legend Shigeru Miyamoto), loosely based on Red's rival Blue. In an interview Tajiri noted the contrast between the characters' relationship in the games and anime; while in the games they were rivals, in the anime, Shigeru represented Satoshi's master. When asked if either Satoshi would equal or surpass Shigeru, Tajiri replied "No! Never!" Ash's character design was initially overseen by Sayuri Ichishi, replaced by Toshiya Yamada during the Diamond and Pearl storyline arc. Ash received a redesign in the Best Wishes! series, which included larger brown irises. In the XY series, he received minor changes, such as a decrease in the size of the 'birthmarks' on his cheeks. Ash received a major design overhaul for the Sun and Moon anime series, which started airing in Japan on November 17, 2016.

Appearances

In the anime

History

Pre-series
In episode 28 of the nineteenth season, "Seeing the Forest for the Trees!", it reveals the true story of why Ash Ketchum loved Pokémon. When he was a little boy, Ash went to the forest to look for wild Pokémon. However, during the trip in the woods, it started to rain, and Ash got lost and was so scared to the point of bursting into tears. Ash was forced to take shelter under a hollow tree. However, he noticed a group of Pokémon who were also seeking shelter from the rain. So, he invited them inside the tree and the Pokémon kept him safe and warm. This made Ash so happy that he wondered how much he wanted to become a Pokémon trainer to travel across the entire world with his Pokémon friends.

In the first episode of the twenty-third season, Ash at the age of six asked his mother if he can go to Professor Oak's Pokémon Summer Camp which she happily signed him up. However, Ash missed the camp due to breaking his alarm clock and overslept.

In episode 7 of the seventeenth season, "Giving Chase at the Rhyhorn Race!", Ash attends Professor Oak's Pokémon Summer Camp, where he had previously met his childhood friend Serena. At one point during the camp, Serena had hurt her knee from falling over after being startled by a Poliwag. Ash had used his handkerchief to wrap up her injury, which she had kept, and returns to Ash in this episode.

In episode 58 of the fifth season, "The Ties That Bind!", Ash started his rivalry with Gary, Professor Oak's grandson, after they both fished out an old PokéBall then broke it in half. After that, Ash and Gary kept both half as a reminder of the day they started their rivalry.

In the series
The series starts with the episode "Pokémon, I Choose You!", with Ash's tenth birthday, which according to Pokémon trainer registration bylaws allowed him to become a full-fledged Pokémon trainer and obtain a starter Pokémon. As a ten-year-old hailing from Pallet Town in the Kanto region, Ash was offered a choice between three Pokémon as his starter: Bulbasaur, Squirtle and Charmander. While he was planning to choose Squirtle, he received the electric type Pokémon Pikachu from Professor Oak instead in this episode, because he woke up late and all the other starter Pokémon had been taken by other trainers. After receiving Pikachu and a Pokédex, Ash left Pallet Town to start his journey. Since then Ash has traveled the world of Pokémon, competed in many challenges and caught newer Pokémon. He has met many companions, such as Misty and Brock.

Throughout the series, Ash's primary enemies are a criminal organization called Team Rocket, specifically the two comical and bumbling members, Jessie and James, and their talking Meowth, who is essentially the third member of the group. Ever since being defeated by Ash's Pikachu in the second episode, "Pokémon Emergency!", the three of them have obsessively never stopped chasing after them to steal Ash's Pikachu, maintaining the delusion that Pikachu is abnormally powerful and presenting it to their criminal boss would make them very rich. As the enduring comical villains of the series, the Team Rocket trio occasionally show signs of goodness, such as care and friendship with their Pokémon and each other, and despite their constant antagonism, they occasionally put their differences aside and work together with Ash against a common threat, such as in Pokémon: The Movie 2000, where they aid Ash in retrieving the three treasures in order to save the world.

During his travels, Ash still had a lot to learn as a trainer. He caught his Pokémon by merely befriending them, knew absolutely nothing about battling, and many of his gym badges were earned rather controversially. In fact, the only legitimate victories were over Lt. Surge, Koga, and Blaine, while the others were earned on technical convenience or given to him out of gratitude. Ash also shows a deep love for Pokémon in the series, protecting wild Pokémon or his own from getting injured or trying to help them, despite getting significantly hurt himself. He honed his skill as a Pokémon trainer and was able to get all 8 badges, enabling him to compete in the Indigo League. Ash was able to go to the 5th round, and achieve the Top 16 — one round further than his competitive rival Gary, who finished in the Top 32. However, due to his inexperience in handling his more powerful Pokémon, Ash was eliminated from his first Pokémon League competition in a very unflattering manner, which greatly disappointed him but he got over it and vowed to not make the same mistake in a league again.

Ash traveled to the Orange Islands with Misty and Tracey Sketchit, a Pokémon watcher, obtained all 4 badges and competed in the Orange League to battle Drake, the Orange League Champion and he won the Orange League.

He then traveled on to the Johto region with Brock and Misty, hoping to meet with Gary and finally defeat him in the Johto League. He won 8 badges and competed in the Johto Conference. Ash beat Gary again, in the 1st round of the conference, and was able to make it to the quarter-finals, and achieve a Top 8 finish.

Ash then moved on and traveled through the Hoenn region, along with Brock and two new characters: May, an aspiring Pokémon coordinator, and her younger brother Max, and together they ended up bringing down the rival teams Team Magma and Team Aqua. He was able to get all 8 badges and then competed in the Hoenn Conference and lost in the 3rd round.

Having gone through several leagues and gotten a lot stronger, Ash decided to challenge the Kanto "Battle Frontier" and its 7 Brains (leaders). Brock, May, and Max accompanied him. Ash defeated all of the Brains and acquired all the 7 Battle Frontier symbols, becoming a "Strong Battle Frontier champion" and qualifying for becoming a Frontier Brain himself. However, Ash, wanting to learn more about Pokémon and get even stronger, decided to continue his journey, not as a Frontier Brain, but as a trainer. However, having acquired all 7 symbols, he left with the privilege of becoming a Frontier Brain if and when he wants in the future.

Ash, along with Brock, traveled to Sinnoh, befriended a new traveling companion, Dawn, and also found a brutal new rival in Paul; and through their journey they encountered and defeated Team Galactic. Ash won all 8 Sinnoh gym badges and competed in the Sinnoh conference at the Lily of the Valley Island. He eventually faced Paul in the quarter-finals of the Sinnoh League Festival and finally defeated him, marking the first time Ash has ever made it into the semi-finals in a Pokémon League. Afterwards, however, Ash was matched against Tobias, a trainer who famously swept all eight Sinnoh League gyms and all other opponents with only his legendary Pokémon Darkrai. Ash was eventually defeated by Tobias, but not without having defeated his Darkrai, as well as his Latios, which is also a legendary Pokémon, whom Ash also defeated in a draw with his final Pokémon, making Ash the only known trainer to have defeated two of Tobias' legendary Pokémon. Ash concluded his participation in the Sinnoh League with an impressive new ranking. He bade farewell with Dawn in Twinleaf Town, and parted ways with Brock for the last time.

Once again, Ash continued his journey to the Unova region, with only his Pikachu. Here, he met and traveled with two new companions: a female trainer named Iris, and a Pokémon Connoisseur named Cilan, who, like Brock before him, is a gym leader. Throughout Unova, Ash met and competed against more rivals than before, including Trip, Bianca, Stephan, Cameron, and Virgil, most of whom he befriended. Unlike previous seasons, Ash notoriously displayed a drop in skill and competence, and instead regressed back to a beginner, showing little of his previous expertise and relearned many of the basics of catching Pokémon (though this may have been due to over-excitement of entering a new region with exclusive Pokémon, and slowly wore off as the seasons went on). However, Ash still managed to win all eight gym badges in Unova and then entered the Unova League, where he defeated his arrogant rival, Trip, in the first match, but was defeated by Cameron in the quarter-finals, one match below his previous Pokémon League ranking. Cameron was then defeated by Virgil, who went on to win the League with his team of Eevee evolutions. Also unlike previous seasons, Ash battled against a much more malevolent Team Rocket, as well as the evil Team Plasma. After his latest attempt to compete in the Unova League, and foiling both Team Rocket and Team Plasma's attempts to enslave Pokémon to conquer the world, Ash's friends traveled with him back to Kanto, where they parted to go own their ways and bade each other farewell.

Ash then ventured to the Kalos region to challenge the Kalos League, as well as learn more about Mega Evolution, a transformation that can take certain fully evolved Pokémon to a more powerful temporary form. While there, he began traveling with the siblings Clemont and Bonnie, along with Serena, whom he had met during a Pokémon summer camp in Pallet Town when they were much younger. Ash gained new rivals like Sawyer and Alain. While in Kalos, Ash befriended and acquired new Pokémon, including Froakie, which later evolved into a powerful Greninja. Although Ash did not yet have a Pokémon that can mega-evolve (at least not in his current party), the group discovered that his Greninja was capable of "Bond Phenomenon", a transformation where Ash and Greninja connect mentally and Greninja's body changes to a color scheme resembling Ash. Like Mega Evolution, the transformation is temporary and makes "Ash-Greninja" much more powerful and well capable of defeating mega-evolved Pokémon. Currently, no other known Pokémon in existence is capable of Bond Phenomenon, and several rivals took great interest in competing with it in the Kalos League with their own mega-evolving Pokémon. Like before, Ash earned all eight gym badges qualifying him to compete in the Kalos League, and with his newest Pokémon, Ash defeated many opponents and their mega-evolved Pokémon, advancing all the way to the finals, breaking his previous highest ranking, but was defeated by Alain. After the tournament, Ash and his friends got involved in Team Flare, the local evil organization, final operation to take over Kalos. During the crisis, Ash and his Pokémon were captured by Team Flare, who unlike Team Rocket and the previous evil organizations, Team Magma and Team Galactic, he dealt with in the past who captured him so he wouldn't meddle in their plans or used him as a hostage, as their leader, Lysandre, wanted to use him alongside Greninja for his plans. Ash's other Pokémon were used by Team Flare as hostages in an attempt to get Ash and Greninja to cooperate. Team Flare used a mini version of their device, capable of controlling Zygarde, in an attempt to control Ash along with Greninja for their Bond Phenomenon while Pikachu and the rest of Ash's Kalos Pokémon watched in shock. However, Ash, who was able to hear Pikachu's voice, and Greninja resisted Team Flare's control as they couldn't break their fighting spirit and the bond they share for their friends and each other then used Bond Phenomenon to break free from their restraints. After Alain freed Ash's Pokémon from their restraints, Ash and his Pokémon were ready to stop Team Flare once and for all with Alain, who was once a Team Flare member, but decided to help stop them as he saw through his mistakes and due to his friendship with Ash as well, helping. Once Team Flare was stopped, Ash released Greninja to help protect Kalos from other threats. Ash and Greninja also wanted to keep themselves and their friends, especially Pikachu and the rest of the Kalos members, out of harm's way knowing that someone like Team Flare would not only try to use their abilities for evil, but would also use anyone close to them as hostages in an attempt to get what they want. Ash then bade farewell to his friends, before returning to Pallet Town once again.

During a vacation with his mother on Melemele Island in the Alola Region, Ash had an encounter with Tapu Koko, one of the local Island Guardian Pokémon, who gave him a Z-Ring, an item that allows a Trainer to bring forth super-powered attacks from their Pokémon. When Ash used the Z-Ring for the first time with Pikachu, it produced a massive surge of energy that overloaded and shattered the Z-Crystal that powered it, making Ash realize that he needed to learn to control it. In order to master the power of the Z-Ring, Ash then decided to stay in Alola and enrolls at the Pokémon School, living with Professor Kukui and studying with his new classmates: Lana, Mallow, Lillie, Sophocles and Kiawe while battling against Team Rocket & Team Skull. During his stay in Alola, Ash not only encountered many new varieties of Pokémon, some of which became part of his new Pokémon team, but also competed in the Alolan Island Challenges, each of which led to a Grand Trial against each of the Island Kahunas; emerging victorious in both the Challenges and Trials, Ash received different Z-Crystals. With the discovery of Pokémon from other dimensions, known as Ultra Beasts, emerging through wormholes, Ash and his classmates became part of the Ultra Guardians team, charged with capturing the Ultra Beasts and returning them to their own dimensions. Ash later participated in the Alola League, resulting in his first Pokémon League conference championship win in his career as a Pokémon Trainer and breaking his last League ranking. After the League was done, Ash decided to go back to Pallet Town once again to continue his journey then bid farewell to his friends before setting off to his hometown.

Ash went to a grand opening of a new research facility in Vermilion City with Professor Oak and his mom. After meeting Lugia and befriending a new Trainer named Goh, Ash accepted the head professor of the new research facility's offer to be a special assistant alongside his new friend. After accepting the offer, Ash decided to stay in Vermilion City as he and Goh will be traveling all over the world to gather information on Pokémon. During his journey, Ash learns about Dynamax and even received a Dynamax band from the current world champion Leon, who is also the Galar Region champion. After seeing that his Pikachu can Gigantamax and losing an unofficial battle against Leon, Ash decided to compete in the World Championships so he can climb up the ranks and have an official battle against the current world champion one day. After climbing the ranks, Ash sought out Mega Evolution as he went to Kalos for a Key Stone and Mega Stone, which increased his Aura abilities. After entering into Masters Eight, Ash participates at Master Tournament and reaches to final where he defeats Leon and becomes a new Monarch.

Ash has considerably improved his abilities as a trainer over the course of the series. However, his earnestness and determination remain the same. During the first season of the series, Ash trained to catch more Pokémon than his childhood rival, Gary Oak, although he was always shown to be the stronger trainer. He soon began to focus more on each of his Pokémon's abilities. Ash has shown to have the ability to sense and control Aura, which was mainly used with either with Riolu or Lucario. Also, Ash can use Bond Phenomenon, which he used with one of his Pokémon. Through his love for Pokémon, Ash seems to understand the feelings of them as he sometimes shares a link with them as he senses their pain, see their thoughts, memories, have them appear in his dream as a way of asking for his help for various reasons and hear what they are saying, although the abilities are usually shown mainly with Legendary Pokémon but it was once shown with a Mythical Pokémon. Also, Ash has shown to sometimes sense a Pokémon presences or when one is coming.

Although he got involved and ended up getting captured by Team Rocket and an evil organization from his past journeys for various reasons, Ash did avoid getting captured or gotten away from a couple of evil organizations, Team Aqua, Team Plasma and Team Skull.

Achievements

Badges, Symbols obtained and Alola trials
Over his journey so far, Ash has collected eight badges from each of the major regions of Kanto, Johto, Hoenn, Sinnoh, Unova and Kalos. In addition, he has also obtained 4 badges from the Orange Archipelago and defeated the Orange Islands Champion to gain the Winners' Trophy. He has also collected all seven Frontier Symbols from Battle Frontier, and has been offered a position as a Frontier Brain, which he declined. In the Alola region, he has completed all the Island Grand Trials, Melemele, Akala, Ula'Ula and Poni Island.

Pokémon League Conference
 Indigo League (Indigo Plateau Conference): Top 16
 Johto League (Silver Conference): Top 8
 Hoenn League (Ever Grande Conference): Top 8
 Sinnoh League (Lily of the Valley Conference): Top 4
 Unova League (Vertress Conference): Top 8
 Kalos League (Lumiose Conference): Runner-up
 Alola League (Manalo Conference): Winner

World Coronation Series
 Masters Eight Tournament: Winner

Voice actors
In Japan throughout the anime media, Rika Matsumoto has always provided the original Japanese voice of Ash. Hana Takeda voices 6 year old Ash in episode 1 of Pokémon Journeys: The Series. For the English dubbing, Veronica Taylor provided the voice of Ash in the first eight seasons of the English adaption of the Pokémon anime, which was dubbed by 4Kids Entertainment. At the time of her audition, Taylor stated that the character was temporarily named Casey, which was the name later given to a recurring character in Johto. After the script was translated from Japanese, the lines were adapted to fit the movements of the character's mouth (called lip flap). All the voices were recorded separately, so Taylor was the only one in the booth when she recorded her lines, which took approximately six to eight hours per episode. Taylor was often the first person to record, so she had to "imagine how the previous line will be said". "Luckily, I work with a great director who helps with the interpretation of the line, matching of the lip flap, and consistency of the voice". Taylor enjoyed playing Ash because of his "low, husky voice" and "energy and excitement".

Taylor commented that Ash and the other characters "loosened up" after the first ten episodes of the anime; she believed the writers were more relaxed and no longer felt the pressure of making sure everything was done correctly. Taylor commented: "I enjoy playing Ash now much more than I did in the very beginning because I can have fun with him more, and we kind of know him and can work out how he really would react. We have the classic Ash responses and things like that." Sarah Natochenny replaced Taylor in season nine when The Pokémon Company International (known at that time as Pokémon USA) took over the licensing, prompting a shift in recording studios.

For the Korean dubbing, Choi Deok-Hui provided the voice of Ash in the first five seasons and first two movies of the Korean adaption of the Pokémon anime, which was dubbed by Seoul Broadcasting System. An Hyeon-Seo replaced Deok-Hui in Pokémon movies three through five. Lee Seon-ho replaced Hyeon-Seo in season 6 and in the sixth Pokémon movie.

In the video games
Ash Ketchum was first mentioned in a video game at the dialogue of Pokémon Play It!, and his first appearance in a game was later in Pokémon Puzzle League, both of which were never released in Japan. He has also appeared in Japanese educational video games Pokémon: Catch the Numbers!, I've Begun Hiragana and Katakana!, and Pico for Everyone Pokémon Loud Battle! for Sega Pico, as well as a player character in the English-language Windows games Pokémon Team Rocket Blast Off, Pokémon Poké Ball Launcher, and Pokémon Seek & Find, distributed by Perdue Farms.

In Pokémon Red, Blue, Yellow, and the remakes of Red and Blue, a character very similar to Ash (named Red) appears as a playable character as well as in cameos in Pokémon Black 2, White 2, Gold, Silver, their remakes, Sun and Moon. The anime re-imagined Red as Ash Ketchum, the same way it re-imagined Red's rival Blue as Gary Oak and Ethan (the protagonist of the second generation Pokémon games as well as their remakes) as Jimmy. Although they are counterparts, they are not the same characters because they originate from different canons and thus developed from different experiences.
Though Pokémon Yellow has certain plot aspects that were inspired by the anime series, the player character is still named Red rather than Ash.

In Pokémon Sun and Moon's demo, the player character, Sun, receives a letter from Ash, along with his Greninja, which is capable of assuming its "Ash-Greninja" form through its ability Battle Bond. Ash also makes a cameo in Ghost Trial of the full game, where one may see a blurry photo of him and his Pikachu in the back room.

Ash and his party from Pokémon Journeys: The Series were added to Pokémon Masters EX starting on August 28 2022 to promote his upcoming battles in the Masters Eight Tournament.

In the manga
The portrayals of Ash in the manga The Electric Tale of Pikachu, and Ash & Pikachu, are very similar to the one in the anime. There are key differences in the manga, though. The Electric Tale of Pikachu is based on Ash's journey up until the end of the Orange Islands travel. Ash is usually seen traveling by himself during the course of this manga although he is joined by Misty and Brock in Indigo sometimes. Misty is the only one to join Ash in the Orange Islands. The Ash & Pikachu manga is similar, although it has the episodes from the anime like "The Fortune Hunters" and "A Goldenrod Opportunity" combined, but with a couple of changes. Manga author Toshihiro Ono cited Ash as one of his favorite characters to draw for the series, stating, "I want to go on a trip with Misty just like him! (And forget about job, rent, etc.)".
In Pokémon Adventures, Red depicts his appearance from what he wore in the games.

In other media
Although not parodied quite as frequently as the franchise mascot Pikachu, Ash still has many parodies and appearances in various other media, ranging from an unofficial fan-made film to several representations in web media, including many parodies on the YouTube channel Smosh.

Ash makes a brief cameo in the animated series The Simpsons, when, in the episode "Postcards from the Wedge", the character Bart Simpson is watching TV while doing his homework, and a parody of the Pokémon anime appears on TV, starring Ash (in what appears to be a loose parody of his Diamond & Pearl outfit) and Pikachu. Bart remarks "Wow, how does this show stay so fresh?", which is both a reference to the length of the anime, as well as referencing the length of The Simpsons itself in an ironic way. In the episode "The Perspiration Implementation" of the TV show The Big Bang Theory, Ash is mentioned by the character Sheldon Cooper when he attempts to ask a girl out by saying "And as Ash Ketchum said to Pikachu, I choose you.", which specifically references how Pikachu was Ash's first Pokémon. In the episode "Chinpokomon" of the animated show South Park, a parody of Ash makes an appearance, along with a parody of Team Rocket's James, as characters in a TV show parodying Pokémon. The title itself is a reference to Pokémon.

A character wearing Ash's League Expo hat makes a cameo in the 4th episode of the 4th season of Rick and Morty.

Ash also makes appearances in several segments of the show Robot Chicken, including "Poké Ball High Life" and "Pokémon Tennis". In the show The Norm Show, the character Tommy thinks that he is Ash, and faces off against the character Norm in the episode "Artie Comes to Town". In the Japanese light novel series High School DxD, the character of the familiar master Zatouji is a clear parody of Ash, even his catchphrase being "Gotta catch 'em all!" Ash also features in an ADHD Short segment called "Pikachu Gets Pokémon Rabies".

A man wearing Ash's original outfit also appears in a few Taiwanese Subway ads teaching passengers basic safety procedures. A man wearing Ash's original League Expo hat is also shown in the third episode of season 4 of the show Metalocalypse. In the episode "Johnny'mon" of the cartoon show Johnny Test, the character Blast Ketchup is a blatant parody of Ash Ketchum. The title is also a parody of Pokémon.

A boy wearing Ash's attire from the original series can be seen in the episode "Operation: A.R.C.H.I.V.E." of Codename: Kids Next Door. Ash also appears in the Captain Tsubasa (2018) series as a spectator, in his Sun and Moon attire.

In the game Overwatch, the character Hanzo says the line "I choose you, spirit dragon", which is a reference to the phrase Ash frequently uses when sending out one of his Pokémon to battle, such as "Pikachu, I choose you!"

Ash also made a brief appearance on The Late Show with Stephen Colbert, where he has a 'Pokémon battle' against Cartoon Donald Trump with Special Prosecutor Robert Mueller.

Reception

The book The Japanification of Children's Popular Culture cited Ash as an example of cultural identification, with the character going through similar motions players of the games had to in order to progress through them. It additionally emphasized the character's growth and development as the anime series progressed. UGO.com noted his hat as iconic and one of the coolest headgear in gaming, while Jian DeLeon of Complex praised him as "stylish," particularly his very first design. The Guinness Book of World Records 2011 Game Edition lists Ash as coming 37th out of 50 in a readers' poll of their favorite video game characters. However, he has been criticized by IGN for staying the same age, his lack of success, and the ambiguity about his father.

Ash has also garnered praise for serving as a role-model to children, and for his persistence despite being an underdog by Business Insider Australia. He has also been cited as a character that incentivizes trying to be the best person you can be, rather than the strongest, or most qualified by the BBC.

Ash's Manalo Conference win has been compared to basketball player LeBron James winning his first ring and film director Martin Scorsese winning his first Oscar.

References

External links

 Ash Ketchum on Bulbapedia
 Ash Ketchum on Serebii

Animated human characters
Male characters in animated series
Television characters introduced in 1997
Animated characters introduced in 1997
Child characters in anime and manga
Child characters in musical theatre
Child characters in television
Child characters in video games
Fictional characters from Kantō
Fictional explorers in video games
Fictional Japanese people in video games
Male characters in anime and manga
Male characters in video games
Nintendo protagonists
Pokémon characters
Video game characters introduced in 1997
Pokémon anime